The Waldorf Warriors football team represents Waldorf University in college football, as part of the North Star Athletic Association.

History
Waldorf's football team played their first NAIA Division II game in 2003. Their former head football coaches include David Bolstorff, Gregg Youngblood, and Kent Anderson.

Coaches

David Bolstorff (2003–2006)

David Bolstorff was the first head football coach for the Waldorf Warriors. He was the head coach from 1965-2006. During his time at Waldorf College his record was 189-184-2.

Greg Youngblood (2007–2011)

Greg Youngblood is the former head football coach for the Dordt College Defenders, located in Sioux Center, Iowa. In 2007, he was named the head football coach for the Waldorf Warriors, where he remained until 2011. Previously, Youngblood had coached for sixteen years at the high school and collegiate levels, including as an assistant coach at Taylor University, in Upland, Indiana; and as a head coach or assistant coach at three New Mexico high schools. During his time at Waldorf, the team won nine games and lost 45.

Kent Anderson (2012–2017)
During Kent Anderson's first season at Waldorf, he instilled a new, dynamic offense that allowed the Warriors to shatter records. In the 2012 season, the team finished with a ranking of 19th in the NAIA in points per game (32.7), higher than the two previous seasons' combined averages. Following that record-breaking season, Anderson was chosen as both the Outstanding Head Coach and Offensive Coordinator by the NAIA for the annual NCAA Division II vs. NAIA Senior Bowl, which takes place in Myrtle Beach, South Carolina.

Immediately prior to his arrival at Waldorf, Anderson spent two seasons as the offensive coordinator at Iowa Wesleyan College, where the team compiled the most wins in a season since 1997. Before coaching at Iowa Wesleyan, Anderson spent 15 years as a head coach in the German Football League (GFL). While there, Anderson compiled a 182–62–5 record, won eight national championships with four teams, and was also a six-time National Coach of the Year.

Josh Littrell (2017–2019)
Josh Littrell was hired for the position of head football coach for the Waldorf Warriors on June 19, 2017. Josh is a veteran coach, former physical education teacher, and game-passing coordinator at Del Rio High School in Del Rio, Texas. A proponent of cultural activities, Littrell once said, "We want to be more competitive, and as part of that, I want each of our students to learn how to be a great teammate first."
Littrell went 8-3 (6-2) in his first season leading the Warriors. Match the total number of wins as the previous four seasons combined. During his 2018 campaign, the Warriors went 5-5 overall and finished second in the conference at 5-2. In 2018 the Warriors set team records for yards per carry, points per game, passing yards, and rushing TDs in a season.
In his final year, Waldorf went 7-3 and 5-2 in the NSAA, finishing second for the third straight year. The Warriors earned their first NAIA Top 25 ranking and finished No. 23 in the final NAIA Top 25 poll. Offensive lineman Robert Mosley, quarterback Hilton "Bo" Joseph, and wide receiver Ryan Martinez all were named All-Americans.

Will Finley (2020–present)
Will Finley was promoted to the position of head football coach for the Waldorf Warriors on March 6, 2020, after spending the 2019 season as the Warriors associate head coach and defensive coordinator.
 Will is a graduate of Benedictine College in Atchison, Kan., where he began his coaching career.He spent 8 years as a coach with the Ravens, his final year (2018) as the interim defensive coordinator for a Benedictine team that advanced to the NAIA National Championship game.

Current coaching staff

References

 
Sports organizations established in 2003
2003 establishments in Iowa